Eurema laeta, the spotless grass yellow, is a small butterfly of the family Pieridae (the yellows and whites), which is found in India, Sri Lanka, China, Indochina, Japan, and onwards to Australia.

Description

Photo gallery

See also
List of butterflies of India
List of butterflies of India (Pieridae)
List of butterflies of Japan

Notes

References
 
 
 
 
 

laeta
Butterflies of Asia
Butterflies of Indochina
Butterflies described in 1836
Taxa named by Jean Baptiste Boisduval